Gama Zeden (born December 1967) is a Chinese politician of Tibetan ethnicity who is a current vice chairman of the Tibet Autonomous Regional Committee of the Chinese People's Political Consultative Conference, in office since January 2022.

He is an alternate member of the 20th Central Committee of the Chinese Communist Party.

Biography
Gama Zeden was born in Jomda County, Tibet Autonomous Region, in December 1967. In 1986, he entered the Minzu University of China, where he majored in ethnic theories and policies.

After graduating in July 1990, he was despatched as an official to the CCP Naqu Prefectural Committee. He joined the Chinese Communist Party (CCP) in May 1992. He was deputy party secretary of Nyima County in July 1995, in addition to serving as magistrate since October 2017. After a short term as deputy party secretary and magistrate of Naqu County (now Seni District) from April 2001 to October 2002, he was appointed secretary-general of the Naqu Prefectural People's Government. He became vice governor of Naqu Prefecture July 2015. He was appointed executive vice governor of Naqu Prefecture in January 2008 and was admitted to member of the Standing Committee of the CCP Naqu Prefectural Committee, the prefecture's top authority. He was made executive deputy secretary of Naqu Prefecture in December 2011, concurrently serving as secretary of the Political and Legal Affairs Commission and secretary of the Public Security Department.

He was deputy secretary-general of Tibet Autonomous Regional People's Government in October 2012 and subsequently executive deputy director and deputy party branch secretary of the Tibet Autonomous Regional Tourism Development Commission in June 2015. In May 2017, he became deputy party branch secretary of the Tibet Autonomous Regional Civil Affairs, rising to party branch secretary the next year.

In October 2020, he took office as director of the Department of Science, Technology and Education of the Ministry of Culture and Tourism, but having held the position for only a year.

In October 2021, he was transferred back to Tibet Autonomous Region and was admitted to member of the Standing Committee of the CCP Tibet Autonomous Regional Committee, the region's top authority. In December 2021, he was chosen as head of the United Front Work Department of the CCP Tibet Autonomous Regional Committee, concurrently serving as vice chairman of the Tibet Autonomous Regional Committee of the Chinese People's Political Consultative Conference since January 2022.

References

1967 births
Living people
People from Jomda County
Minzu University of China alumni
Central Party School of the Chinese Communist Party alumni
Sichuan University alumni
People's Republic of China politicians from Tibet
Chinese Communist Party politicians from Tibet
Alternate members of the 20th Central Committee of the Chinese Communist Party